Pitter can refer to:
48785 Pitter, main-belt asteroid
Aslie Pitter MBE, British footballer
Cherry pitter, a device to remove pits from cherries
Premysl Pitter, Czech pedagogue and humanist
René Pitter, Austrian footballer
Ruth Pitter, British poet